The Kunggara, also known as Kuritjara, are an indigenous Australian people of the southern Cape York Peninsula in Queensland.

Language
The Kunggara spoke Gurdjar, which had two dialects, Gunggara and Rip. Gavan Breen did a salvage study of the language, drawing on information obtained during an interview with one of the last speakers, Elsie McKillop, conducted at Bloodwood.

Country
Staaten River and running south to the Smithburne River and Delta Downs. The limits of their inland extension lay around Stirling and Lotus Vale.

Neighbouring tribes were the Maikulan and Maijabi.

Alternative names
 Gilbert River tribe
 Gunggara
 Koonkurri
 Kuri'tjari
 Kutjar
 Ungorri

Source:

Notes

Citations

Sources

Aboriginal peoples of Queensland